WFMA-LP (channel 52) is a defunct low-powered television station formerly licensed to and located in Farmville, Virginia.

History
The station signed on October 15, 1992 as W52BS and was located on channel 52. On February 21, 2000, W52BS changed its call letters to WFMA. It was a sister station to WFLV-LP (now defunct) and WKYV-LP (now WZTD-LD, a Telemundo network affiliate) but it currently a sister station to WSVL-LP, channel 48 in Keysville, Virginia.

The station was to broadcast on channel 28 in Richmond, but was denied by the FCC.

The station was silent and its license remained active until October 27, 2010, at which point the licensee surrendered the license. The FCC cancelled the station's license and deleted the WFMA-LP call sign from its database.

External links

FMA-LP
Defunct television stations in the United States
Television channels and stations disestablished in 2010
Television channels and stations established in 1992
1992 establishments in Virginia
2010 disestablishments in Virginia
FMA-LP